Battle of Lake Huleh may refer to:

Battle of Lake Huleh (1157) between the Kingdom of Jerusalem and the Zengids
Battle of Lake Huleh (1771) between the Ottomans and Palestinian rebels